This 2006–07 Minnesota Wild season began on October 5, 2006. It was the Wild's seventh season in the National Hockey League (NHL).

Regular season
Excluding seven shootout goals allowed, the Wild finished the regular season with just 184 goals allowed, the fewest in the NHL.

Season standings
Here is how the Wild did in the standings in 2006–07.

Schedule and results
Here is the Wild's 2006–07 schedule with game by game results.

October

November

December

January

February

March

April

Green background indicates win.     
Red background indicates regulation loss.   
White background indicates overtime/shootout loss.

Playoffs

The Minnesota Wild ended the 2006–07 regular season as the Western Conference's seventh seed.

Western Conference Quarter-finals: vs. (2) Anaheim Ducks
Anaheim wins series 4–1

Player statistics

Transactions
The Wild were involved in the following transactions during the 2006–07 season.

Trades

Free agents acquired

Free agents lost

Draft picks
Minnesota's picks at the 2006 NHL Entry Draft in Vancouver, British Columbia. The Wild had the ninth overall pick in the draft. They also had the Edmonton Oilers first round pick, 17th overall, which they used to trade for Pavol Demitra from the Los Angeles Kings on draft day.

See also
2006–07 NHL season

References

Game log: Minnesota Wild game log on espn.com
Team standings: NHL standings on espn.com
Player Stats: Minnesota Wild 2006–07 Reg. Season Stats on espn.com
Draft Picks: 2006 NHL Entry Draft

External links
Official site of the Minnesota Wild

Minn
Minn
Minnesota Wild seasons